The county of Flintshire is on the north-east coast of Wales, and two ancient border earthworks run through the length of the county. There are 131 scheduled monuments in the post-1996 county of Flintshire. (The historic county of Flintshire, with its unusual separate exclave, is now split between the unitary areas of Flintshire, Wrexham and Denbighshire, so would have had considerably more scheduled sites). There are a great many prehistoric sites for such a small county. With only one confirmed Neolithic site, it is the Bronze Age and Iron Age sites that dominate, 67 of them found mainly on the north-west of the county. In the main these are burial mounds with eight hillforts and other enclosures. From the early medieval period, Offa's Dyke has ten notable sections in the county, whilst the older Wat's Dyke has nineteen scheduled sections. From the post-Norman medieval period, Flintshire offers a very diverse range of monument types: twenty sites, with ten different site types, including castles, castle mounds, moated sites, chapels and a holy well, field systems, a deserted village and an abbey. In the post-medieval period, there is a packhorse bridge and a lockup, but it is the industrial sites that stand out, especially the water-powered industries in the Greenfield Valley and the pottery sites in Buckley. Flintshire lies wholly within the historic county of Flintshire.

Scheduled monuments have statutory protection. It is illegal to disturb the ground surface or any standing remains. The compilation of the list of sites is undertaken by Cadw Welsh Historic Monuments, which is an executive agency of the National Assembly of Wales. The list of scheduled monuments below is supplied by Cadw with additional material from RCAHMW and Clwyd-Powys Archaeological Trust.

Scheduled monuments in Flintshire

See also
List of Cadw properties
List of castles in Wales
List of hill forts in Wales
Historic houses in Wales
List of monastic houses in Wales
List of museums in Wales
List of Roman villas in Wales

References
Coflein is the online database of RCAHMW: Royal Commission on the Ancient and Historical Monuments of Wales, CPAT is the Clwyd-Powys Archaeological Trust, Cadw is the Welsh Historic Monuments Agency

Flintshire